Daedalochila is a genus of air-breathing land snails, terrestrial pulmonate gastropod mollusks in the family Polygyridae.

These are small snails, only about 10 mm to 15 mm in diameter (or approximately one-half inch), notable for their elaborately convoluted apertures, with only very narrow openings. Their range is limited to the southern United States and northern Mexico.

Species 
This genus contains the following species and subspecies:
 Daedalochila adamnis (fossil)
 Daedalochila auriculata
 Daedalochila auriformis
 Daedalochila avara
 Daedalochila chisosensis
 Daedalochila delecta
 Daedalochila hausmani
 Daedalochila hippocrepis
 Daedalochila oppilata
 Daedalochila postelliana
 Daedalochila postelliana carolina
 Daedalochila postelliana espiloca
 Daedalochila postelliana peninsulae
 Daedalochila postelliana subclausa
 Daedalochila scintilla

 Daedalochila troostiana*
 Daedalochila uvulifera
 Daedalochila uvulifera bicornuta
 Daedalochila uvulifera margueritae
 Daedalochila uvulifera striata

References

Polygyridae